The Hyena is a short story by Paul Bowles. It was first published in Transatlantic Review #11 (Winter 1962). It was later included in his short fiction collection The Time of Friendship (1967) published by Holt, Rinehart and Winston.

Plot
A Hyena engages in perfidy to lure a complacent stork to his lair, invoking the teachings of Islam to ensnare his prey. The stork clings to his moral and religious certitudes, enlisting in his own destruction. When the Hyena returns to feed on the rotting carcass of the stork he "thanks Allah for a nose that can smell carrion on the wind."

Theme
"The Hyena" is one of the three fables that appear in Bowles's short fiction collection The Time of Friendship (1967). The other two are The Successor (1951) and The Garden (1964). The tale conforms structurally to the fairy tale The Gingerbread Man. Biographer Johannes Willem Bertens writes: 

Biographer Allen Hibbard notes that the story may be viewed as an "anti-fable" in that it rejects morals sanctioned by religious institutions: "'The Hyena' seems to suggest that religion itself, or at least its corrupt manifestations, is a hoax and that we are naive if we do not realize the Manichean principles by which the real world operates." As such, Hibbard discerns Nietzsche's On the Genealogy of Morality outlook Bowles advances in "The Hyena."

Literary critic John Ditsky observes:

Footnotes

Sources 
 Bowles, Paul. 2001. Paul Bowles; Collected Stories, 1939-1976. Black Sparrow Press. Santa Rosa. 2001.
Ditsky, John. 1986. The Time of Friendship: The Short Stories of Paul Bowles. Twentieth Century Literature, 34, no. 3-4 (1986) pp. 373-377. 
Hibbard, Allen. 1993. Paul Bowles: A Study of the Short Fiction. Twayne Publishers. New York. 

1962 short stories
Short stories by Paul Bowles
Works originally published in Transatlantic Review (1959–1977)